Genchev (female form Gencheva (Генчева); also appearing in the German transliteration variants Gentschew or Gentscheff) is a Bulgarian patronymic surname which is derived from the male given name Gencho (Генчо) by adding the east Slavic patronymic suffix -ев (-ev). Notable people with the surname include:
 Angel Genchev (born 1967), Bulgarian weightlifter
 Boncho Genchev (born 1964), Bulgarian retired footballer
 Diyan Genchev (born 1975), Bulgarian retired footballer 
 Lyubomir Genchev (born 1986), Bulgarian footballer 
 Petar Genchev (born 1998), Bulgarian footballer
 Stanislav Genchev (born 1981), Bulgarian retired footballer

References 

Bulgarian-language surnames